Kot Karam Khan is a small town in the Rahim Yar Khan District of Punjab, Pakistan. Its geographical coordinates are 28° 35' 20" north, 70° 8' 40" east and its original name (with diacritics) is Kot Karam Khān.

It is surrounded by many small villages, with the nearest large town being Jamaldin Wali. The district capital, Rahim Yar Khan, is 32 km to the northeast.

History and demographics
As of the 1998 census, the town had a population of between 3,000 and 4,000.

See also
Rajan Pur Kalan
Bhong Masjid

References

External links
 https://web.archive.org/web/20110721200251/http://www.elections.com.pk/candidatedetails.php?id=12206
 https://web.archive.org/web/20090307031825/http://www.wasaib.com/seraiki-wasaib-baloch-tribes.html

 Populated places in Rahim Yar Khan District